Ely railway station is on the Fen line in the east of England, serving the city of Ely, Cambridgeshire. It is an important junction for three other lines; the Ely to Peterborough Line, the Ipswich to Ely Line and the Norwich to Ely line.

Ely is a busy station with trains running to a variety of destinations including London, Birmingham, Manchester and Liverpool. It is managed by Greater Anglia which is also one of four train operators that serve the station, the others being Great Northern, CrossCountry and East Midlands Railway.

The station was opened in 1845 by the Eastern Counties Railway at a cost of £81,500, the land on which it was built being a marshy swamp. The station was modified substantially by British Rail in the early 1990s, at the time that electrification of the line was taking place.

Description
The station building was designed by Francis Thompson (architect) although Sancton Wood as chief architect is often given credit. On opening the station building had two Italianate towers – one at the north end and the another above the booking office. There were two cubed pavilions either side of an arcade. When the station opened it had three platforms and these were linked by a footbridge to the south of the station buildings. This footbridge was later replaced (sometime before 1902) by a substantial brick footbridge located at the north end of the station but by 1925 a subway had been constructed and this is in use today (2020).

In the 1920s there were carriage sidings to the east of the station which were used by stock for local all stations trains towards Newmarket,  and Norwich. The engine shed and goods yard were located south of the station and a level crossing was located immediately north of the station. The level crossing existed because the underbridge had limited clearance so taller lorries had to travel this way sometimes causing delays to the railway services.

The station was rebuilt in the 1929/1930 by the LNER in a similar style and it is suspected that the towers were removed at that time.  While the rest of the structures remained intact, during the remodelling in the 1990s the space for three tracks between the platforms (the third track had been removed some years earlier) was reduced to two and the lines through the station were electrified. On 1 November 2018 following the opening of the Ely bypass, the level crossing immediately north of the station was closed to road traffic.

One and a half miles north of the station the line splits three ways with the lines towards  and Peterborough, King's Lynn and Norwich. There is also a loop that allows for traffic from the King's Lynn and Norwich lines a direct route to March and Peterborough that diverges here and joins the Peterborough line at Ely West Junction.

Services

July 1922
All services in 1922 were operated by the Great Eastern Railway. Ely was the origin point for some local stopping services to March, Newmarket, King's Lynn and Norwich as well as the branch line to St Ives. As a result, there were some carriage sidings on the east side of the station where stock for these was stabled overnight.

Longer distance services all called at Ely although one exception was the 11.20 London St Pancras – King's Lynn and Hunstanton. The GER had running rights into St. Pancras via the Tottenham and Hampstead and it was used by them when running royal trains to Sandringham which was located on the Hunstanton line. Most London trains originated at Liverpool Street station.

Some trains such as the 11.50 Liverpool Street service arrived at Ely at 13.34 and split into Hunstanton and Norwich portions. Pullman cars and restaurant cars worked would have been seen on the longer distance trains operating through the area at this time.
A number of services to and from the Norwich line avoided the station completely, by being routed via the West Curve unlike 2020, where nearly all services call at Ely and reverse.

Ely was served by the Hook Continental service from Parkeston Quay to various destinations in the North and Midlands. 
By 2020 standards service levels were low and on Sunday there were few trains running. For example, on the King's Lynn line there was one departure to Hunstanton departing Ely at 12.00 and one to King's Lynn at 17.40.

Present Day
The station is served by four operators:

Services are operated using Class 158 diesel multiple units (or occasionally, Class 156 diesel multiple units) which reverse at Ely.
Outside peak hours the services run non-stop between London and Cambridge as part of the half-hourly "Cambridge Cruiser" service. Trains then continue beyond Cambridge, with one an hour terminating at Ely and one continuing stopping at all stations on the Fen Line to King's Lynn. The journey from King's Cross to Ely is timetabled to take just over an hour on the fastest services. During peak hours most trains divide (northbound) or couple (southbound) at Cambridge which adds some minutes to the journey time. In addition, during peak hours most services make additional stops between London Kings Cross and Cambridge which contributes further to an extended journey time. During recent years the number of direct services has increased; from the timetable change of December 2013 there are direct services from London every half hour from 16:44 to 23:14. Some off-peak services can take as little as 1 hour and 5 minutes between London and Ely. During peak hours they can take up to 1 hour and 21 minutes. All services are operated by Class 387 electrical multiple units.
 Greater Anglia serves the station with three routes:
An hourly service between Cambridge and Norwich via the Breckland Line. These services normally use four coach Class 755 units. Four units are diagrammed to work the hourly service. Nine services a day are extended to Stansted Airport 
These services normally use three or four coach Class 755 units. Two units are diagrammed to work the two hourly service.
On weekdays there are four services that operate to London Liverpool Street in the morning peak, three of which originate at King's Lynn while one commences at Ely. There are four return journeys in the evening; one terminating at Ely while the other three continue to King's Lynn. There is no service on Saturday or Sunday. These services normally use Class 720 electrical multiple units, replacing the now stored Class 379

Summary

Retail

There are two branches of Locoespresso on the station: one on platform 1, with the other on platforms 2 and 3. These serve hot and cold drinks, as well as snacks, magazines and newspapers.  Platform 1 also has an L.A. Golden Bean kiosk, which sells hot & cold drinks and snacks.

Operations

Accidents and incidents
On 25 August 1866, a passenger train derailed near Ely due to defective track. One person was killed and five were seriously injured.
On 1 June 1870, a passenger train was derailed near Ely. Some passengers sustained minor injuries.
On 2 April 1874, two freight trains collided at Ely.
On 16 January 1890, a train from Newmarket ran into the rear of a freight train near Ely.
On 26 September 1905, a freight train derailed at Dock Junction, fouling the adjacent line. A passenger train collided with derailed wagons. Four passengers were injured, one seriously.
On 22 June 2007, a goods train derailed at Hawk Bridge which carries the Ipswich line over the River Great Ouse a mile south of Ely. Photographs showed derailed wagons on their side, only prevented from plunging off the embankment by subsidiary structures and their attachment to the rest of the train. As a consequence of the derailment the bridge had to be rebuilt and there were no train services between Ely and Bury St. Edmunds until the works were completed on 21 December 2007.
On 14 August 2017, a freight train was derailed at Ely West Junction, near Queen Adelaide.

Engine Shed
Opened in 1847, the shed would have housed locomotives for some of the local all stations services operating around Ely. A shed was employed from opening but this was replaced by a second structure in 1867.

This was a single road engine shed located on the up side, south of the station. The shed was a corrugated iron affair and a timber coaling stage allowed coaling of trains by hand. There was a turntable which was provided from opening and replaced by a 45-foot turntable in 1879 and as loco designs got bigger this in turn was replaced by a 55-foot turntable in 1912.

A short siding extended from the loco yard to a small dock on the river.

In July 1922 the allocation was:- .

The D13/D14 class were employed on local passenger services with some of the J15 0-6-0s which would have also worked freight trains. The J69 tank engine was employed to shunt the goods yard and station area.
It is unclear when the shed was demolished but steam locomotives continued to use the site until the end of 1962. After that, an outbased Cambridge diesel shunter took care of shunting duties in the area until the early 1990s. When not in use, this was stabled in a short siding adjacent to the station.

Signalling
The list below shows the signal boxes operating in the Ely area when the area was controlled by manually operated by semaphore signals. The boxes are listed south to north.

The station area is currently (2020) controlled by Cambridge Power Signal Box.

See also
 Railways in Ely

Notes

External links 

 Photographs of Derailment on Newmarket Bridge

Ely, Cambridgeshire
Railway stations in Cambridgeshire
DfT Category D stations
Former Great Eastern Railway stations
Railway stations in Great Britain opened in 1845
Railway stations served by East Midlands Railway
Railway stations served by CrossCountry
Railway stations served by Govia Thameslink Railway
Greater Anglia franchise railway stations